The Libertas Institute (LI) is a libertarian think tank located in Lehi, Utah. The organization's stated mission is "to advance the cause of liberty within the State of Utah." The Institute focuses on free market policies, private property rights, and civil liberties issues, including police reform.

Issues
In February 2015, the Libertas Institute and the Drug Policy Project of Utah conducted a poll which showed that the majority of Utah residents favor the legality of medical cannabis. The organization has opposed current regulations on the study of agricultural marijuana, arguing that regulations governing the state's public university research of hemp are too strict. Along with the American Civil Liberties Union of Utah, the Libertas Institute opposed a Utah legislative bill that would allow state police to use unmanned drones without a search warrant. The organization favors allowing ridesharing companies to legally compete with taxi cab companies.

Tuttle Twins 
The Tuttle Twins is a libertarian children's book series published by the Libertas Institute and written by Libertas President Connor Boyack. The book series was made into a television show that raised $4.6 million in crowdsourced funding.

References

External links
 

Libertarian think tanks
Think tanks established in 2011
Non-profit organizations based in Utah